Epitheca is a genus of dragonflies in the family Corduliidae. They are commonly known as baskettails. Baskettails' distinction is the specially adapted, upturned abdomen tip of the females which allows them to carry their egg masses in a small, orange-tinted globule.

Some authorities spin off the North American baskettails into two new genera, Epicordulia and Tetragoneuria, but this has not gained widespread acceptance and most references place them under this genus.

Species
The genus contains the following species:
Epitheca bimaculata  – Eurasian baskettail
Epitheca canis  – beaverpond baskettail
Epitheca costalis  – slender baskettail or stripe-winged baskettail
Epitheca cynosura   – common baskettail
Epitheca marginata 
Epitheca petechialis   – dot-winged baskettail
Epitheca princeps  – prince baskettail
Epitheca semiaquea   – mantled baskettail
Epitheca sepia   – sepia baskettail
Epitheca spinigera  – spiny baskettail
Epitheca spinosa   – robust baskettail
Epitheca stella   – Florida baskettail

Notes

References

 Genus Epitheca - Baskettails, BugGuide
 Image of female baskettail sp. with egg mass on tip of tail 

Corduliidae
Anisoptera genera
Taxa named by Hermann Burmeister